The 2011–12 Odense Boldklub season was the club's 124th season, and their 51st appearance in the Danish Superliga. As well as the Superliga, they competed in the Danish Cup, UEFA Champions League and UEFA Europa League.

First team 

Last updated on 1 May 2012

Transfers and loans

Transfers in

Transfers out

Competitions

Overall

Overview

{| class="wikitable" style="text-align: center"
|-
!rowspan=2|Competition
!colspan=8|Record
|-
!
!
!
!
!
!
!
!
|-
| Superliga

|-
| Danish Cup

|-
| UEFA Champions League

|-
| UEFA Europa League 

|-
! Total

Superliga

Results summary

Result by round

League table

Matches

UEFA Champions League 

On 15 July 2011, Odense were drawn against Greek side Panathinaikos. They made it through to the play-offs, but were knocked out by La Liga side Villarreal and did not make the group stage.

Third qualifying round 

Odense won 5–4 on aggregate

Play-off round 

Villarreal won 3–1 on aggregate

UEFA Europa League

Group stage

Squad statistics

Goalscorers
Includes all competitive matches. The list is sorted by shirt number when total goals are equal.

References 

Odense Boldklub seasons